The Thomas A. Richins House at 405 N. Five Hundred East in Pleasant Grove, Utah, United States, was built in 1897.  It was listed on the National Register of Historic Places in 1987.

It is built of soft rock.

References

Houses completed in 1897
Houses in Utah County, Utah
Houses on the National Register of Historic Places in Utah
National Register of Historic Places in Utah County, Utah
Buildings and structures in Pleasant Grove, Utah